Leipzig Miltitzer Allee is a railway station located in Leipzig, Germany. The station opened in December 1983 and was closed between April 2011 and 15 December 2013. The station is located on the Leipzig-Plagwitz–Leipzig Miltitzer Allee railway. The train services are operated by Deutsche Bahn, as part of the S-Bahn Mitteldeutschland.

References

Miltitzer
Railway stations in Germany opened in 1983